The Brown Site, designated 20GR21, is an archaeological site located along the Pine River near Tyler Road, south of Alma College.  It is situated on a sandy point near a small creek. The site was discovered in 1976 as part of a survey of the Pine River watershed by researchers from Alma College, and excavations were conducted in 1977 and 1979.  It is the site of a late Woodland period village dating to about AD 1000, covering .

The Brown Site and was listed on the National Register of Historic Places in 1985.

References

Further reading

Buildings and structures in Gratiot County, Michigan
Archaeological sites on the National Register of Historic Places in Michigan
National Register of Historic Places in Gratiot County, Michigan